Yeni Asmarani (born 20 March 1992) is an Indonesian badminton player from Djarum club.

Achievements

BWF Grand Prix 
The BWF Grand Prix had two levels, the Grand Prix and Grand Prix Gold. It was a series of badminton tournaments sanctioned by the Badminton World Federation (BWF) and played between 2007 and 2017.

Women's singles

  BWF Grand Prix Gold tournament
  BWF Grand Prix tournament

References

External links 
 

1992 births
Living people
Sportspeople from Bandung
Indonesian female badminton players
20th-century Indonesian women
21st-century Indonesian women